Canyon Independent School District is a school district that serves the Canyon and Amarillo area in Randall County of the Texas Panhandle.  The district covers a large area, which encompasses 732 square miles.  The north end of the district has nine campuses in south Amarillo, with five in Canyon and one campus located between the two cities.

In 2009, the school district was rated "academically acceptable" by the Texas Education Agency.

In 2018, the district was recognized for innovation as a Google Reference District.

Demographics
According to the National Center for Education Statistics, Canyon Independent School District serves a community of 60,755 people with a Median Household Income of $74,886. 7.6% of the families in the Canyon ISD live below the poverty level. Total households in the community is 21,443.

Race/Ethnicity of Canyon ISD:
White: 78%
Hispanic or Latino (of any race): 18%
Black: 1%
Asian: 1%

High schools
Canyon Independent School District has three high schools. Each high school is listed with their known GreatSchools rating.

Canyon High School
GreatSchools rating: 7/10 
Randall High School
GreatSchools rating: 6/10 
 Midway Alternative High School
GreatSchools rating: Unrated 
 Youth Center of the High Plains
GreatSchools rating: None
 West Plains High School
GreatSchools rating: Unrated

Junior High & Intermediate Schools
Canyon Independent School District has five Junior High / Intermediate schools. Each high school is listed with their known GreatSchools rating.

Canyon Junior High School
GreatSchools rating: 7/10 
Canyon Intermediate School
GreatSchools rating: 6/10 
West Plains Junior High School - Amarillo
GreatSchools rating: 8/10 
Greenways Intermediate School - Amarillo
GreatSchools rating: 6/10 
Pinnacle Intermediate School - Amarillo
GreatSchools rating: None
Randall Junior High School - Amarillo
GreatSchools rating: None

Elementary schools
Canyon Independent School District has eight Elementary Schools. Each high school is listed with their known GreatSchools rating.

Crestview Elementary School
GreatSchools rating: 10/10 
Reeves-Hinger Elementary School
GreatSchools rating: 8/10 
Arden Road Elementary School - Amarillo
GreatSchools rating: 9/10 
Gene Howe Elementary School - Amarillo
GreatSchools rating: 7/10 
Lakeview Elementary School - Amarillo
GreatSchools rating: 4/10 
Sundown Lane Elementary School - Amarillo
GreatSchools rating: 8/10 
Hillside Elementary School - Amarillo
GreatSchools rating: 5/10 
City View Elementary School - Amarillo
GreatSchools rating: 6/10

See also
List of school districts in Texas

Notes

External links
Canyon Independent School District's official web site
Canyon ISD Technology page
Canyon ISD Community Learning
CISD E-Flyers communications site

 
School districts in Texas
School districts established in 1895